Potton & Burton, formerly Craig Potton Publishing, is a book publishing company based in Nelson, New Zealand, and is one of the largest independent book publishers in New Zealand.

History
Potton & Burton was first established in 1987 as Craig Potton Publishing by conservationist Craig Potton, who initially founded it to publish books of his photography. It publishes a diverse range of non-fiction books focused on New Zealand, as well as a range of photographic calendars. Potton (born 1952) is a photographer and prominent environmentalist.

The company changed its name to Potton & Burton in March 2015, to more accurately reflect the role of Robbie Burton, who has been the publisher since 1990, and who has been a co-owner for many years. In 2019 the company out-sourced its sales and distribution to Bateman Books in Auckland, but continues to publish new books and calendars from its Nelson office, while also maintaining a strong backlist of New Zealand books.

References

External links
 
 Robbie Burton Publisher
Craig Potton Publishing on Open Library

Book publishing companies of New Zealand
Publishing companies established in 1987
Mass media in Nelson, New Zealand